The 2005 Saskatchewan Roughriders finished in 4th place in the West Division with a 9–9 record. They crossed over to the east and appeared in the East Semi-Final where they lost to the Montreal Alouettes.

Offseason

CFL draft

Preseason

Regular season

Season standings

Season schedule

Roster

Awards and records
CFL's Most Outstanding Offensive Lineman Award – Gene Makowsky
Jeff Nicklin Memorial Trophy – Corey Holmes (RB)

CFL All-Star selections
Eddie Davis, Defensive Back
Andrew Greene, Offensive Guard
Corey Holmes, Special Teams
Gene Makowsky, Offensive Tackle
Omarr Morgan, Cornerback
Scott Schultz, Defensive Tackle

Western All-Star selections
Eddie Davis, Defensive Back
Andrew Greene, Offensive Guard
Corey Holmes, Special Teams
Gene Makowsky, Offensive Tackle
Omarr Morgan, Cornerback
Scott Schultz, Defensive Tackle
Elijah Thurmon, Wide Receiver

Milestones

Playoffs

East Semi-Final

References

Saskatchewan Roughriders
Saskatchewan Roughriders seasons